2C-O-4 (4-isopropoxy-2,5-dimethoxyphenethylamine) is a phenethylamine of the 2C family.  It is also a positional isomer of isoproscaline and was probably first synthesized by Alexander Shulgin.  It produces hallucinogenic, psychedelic, and entheogenic effects.  Because of the low potency of 2C-O-4, and the inactivity of 2C-O, Shulgin felt that the 2C-O series would not be an exciting area for research, and did not pursue any further analogues.

Chemistry
2C-O-4 is in a class of compounds commonly known as phenethylamines, and the systematic chemical name is 2-(4-isopropoxy-2,5-dimethoxyphenyl)ethanamine.

Effects
Little is known about the psychopharmacological effects of 2C-O-4.  Based on the one report available in his book PiHKAL, Shulgin lists the dosage of 2C-O-4 as being >60 mg.

Pharmacology
The mechanism that produces the hallucinogenic and entheogenic effects of 2C-O-4 is unknown.

Dangers
The toxicity of 2C-O-4 is not known.

Legality

Canada
As of October 31, 2016, 2C-O-4 is a controlled substance (Schedule III) in Canada.

United States
2C-O-4 is unscheduled and unregulated in the United States; however, because of its close similarity in structure and effects to mescaline and 2C-T-7, possession and sale of 2C-O-4 may be subject to prosecution under the Federal Analog Act.

See also
2C-O
2C-T-4

References

2C (psychedelics)
Isopropyl compounds
Catechol ethers
Resorcinol ethers